Tomasz Pieńko (born 5 January 2004) is a Polish professional footballer who plays as an attacking midfielder for Zagłębie Lubin.

Career statistics

Club

Notes

References

External links

2004 births
Living people
Sportspeople from Wrocław
Association football midfielders
Polish footballers
Poland youth international footballers
Poland under-21 international footballers
Zagłębie Lubin players
III liga players
II liga players
Ekstraklasa players